Hemamala Indivari Karunadasa is an Assistant Professor of Chemistry at Stanford University. She works on hybrid organic – inorganic materials, such as perovskites, for clean energy and large area lighting.

Early life and education 
Karunadasa grew up in Colombo. She attended high school in Sri Lanka and was a student at Ladies' College, Colombo. She thought that she would become a doctor, and eventually decided to apply to university in America. She attended Princeton University, where she worked with Robert Cava on the geometric magnetic frustration of metal oxides. Cava's excitement about research inspired Karunadasa to continue her own academic career. Graduating with a degree in Chemistry and a Certificate in Materials Science and Engineering, Karunadasa joined the University of California, Berkeley for her doctoral studies. There she worked in the lab of Jeffrey R. Long on heavy-atom building units for magnetic materials and electrocatalysts for water splitting. Karunadasa continued her work on water-splitting electrocatalysts with Jeffrey R. Long and Christopher Chang as a postdoctoral fellow. The molybdenum-oxo metal complex synthesized by Karunadasa is around seventy times cheaper than platinum, the most commonly used metal catalyst in water splitting. She then moved to the California Institute of Technology, where she worked on catalysts for hydrocarbon oxidation with Harry B. Gray as a BP Postdoctoral Fellow.

Career 
Karunadasa began her independent career at Stanford University in 2012. Her group synthesizes hybrid perovskite materials that combine small organic molecules with inorganic solids. Three-dimensional lead iodide perovskites are being investigated for solar cells, but they can be both unstable and toxic. For example, their sensitivity to water makes them difficult materials to use in the fabrication of large-scale devices. Karunadasa is interested in ways to mitigate these shortcomings, and any transient changes that may occur when these materials absorb light. In particular, Karunadasa has created two-dimensional perovskites, with thin inorganic sheets, that can be tuned to emit every colour of visible light. In these systems the organic small molecules are sandwiched between the sheets. In the case of thick inorganic sheets, the inorganic materials act as absorbers, and enhance the stability of the perovskite materials. The organo-metal-halide perovskites created by Karunadasa and her collaborator Michael McGehee can be processed in solution. She believes that through careful chemical design it is possible to determine the fate of photogenerated charge carriers. Karunadasa has investigated the lifetimes of acoustic phonons in lead iodide perovskites with Michael Toney and Aron Walsh.

Awards and honours 
Her awards and honours include;

 2003 Princeton University Outstanding Undergraduate Thesis in Inorganic Chemistry
 2006 Tyco Electronics Graduate Fellowship
 2011 BP Postdoctoral Fellowship
 2013 Thieme Chemistry Journal Award
 2014 International Conference on Coordination Chemistry ICCC41 Rising Star Award
 2014 National Science Foundation CAREER Award
 2015 Sloan Research Fellowship
 2015 Stanford University Terman Faculty Fellowship

Selected publications 
Her publications include;

 
 
 

Her work was featured in the Journal of the American Chemical Society Young Investigators Issue in 2019. She serves on the editorial board of Inorganic Chemistry.

References 

American people of Sri Lankan descent
Sri Lankan women academics
Sri Lankan women scientists
People from Colombo
Princeton University alumni
Stanford University faculty
University of California, Berkeley alumni
Year of birth missing (living people)
Living people
Inorganic chemists